Robbin F. Laird (born 1946) is a military and security analyst.

Biography
He has taught at Columbia University, Queens College, Princeton University and Johns Hopkins University. He worked with The Center for Defense Analysis and the Institute for Defense Analysis. He is a member of the Board of Contributors of AOL Defense and writes for The Diplomat. He is the director of the ICSA, LLC since 2000 and co-founder of the website Second Line of Defense, since 2010 and of Defense.info since 2018.
He is the editor of two defense websites, Second Line of Defense and Defense Information.
He became a fellow of The Williams Foundation, Canberra, Australia in 2018.

Awards
National Science Foundation
US Institute of Peace
Tinker Foundation
Fellow, The Williams Foundation, Canberra Australia

Bibliography
The Scientific-Technological Revolution and Soviet Foreign Policy: Pergamon Policy Studies on International Politics, 1982, with Erik P. Hoffmann 
Politics of Economic Modernization in the Soviet Union, 1982, with Erik P. Hoffman 
Soviet Union and Strategic Arms, 1985, with Dale R. Herspring
Technocratic Socialism: The Soviet Union in the Advanced Industrial Era, 1985, with Erik P. Hoffman
Soviet Union, the West and the Nuclear Arms Race, 1986
French Security Policy, 1986
Strangers and Friends: The Franco-German Security Relationship, 1989
West European Arms Control Policy, 1989
USSR and the Western Alliance, 1989, with Susan Clark
The Future of Deterrence: NATO Nuclear Forces Aft Inf, 1989
The Soviets, Germany, and the New Europe, 1991
Soviet Foreign Policy: Classic and Contemporary, 1991, with Frederick J. Fleron and Erik P. Hoffmann
Classic Issues in Soviet Foreign Policy: From Lenin to Brezhnev, 1991, with Erik P. Hoffmann and Frederic J. Fleron
The Revolution in Military Affairs: Allied Perspectives, 2012, with Holger H Mey
Three Dimensional Warriors: Second Edition, 2013
Rebuilding American Military Power in the Pacific: A 21st-Century Strategy, 2013, with Edward Timperlake
The F-35 and 21st Century Defence: Shaping a Way Ahead, 2016
France, The Soviet Union, And The Nuclear Weapons Issue, 2019
The Return of Direct Defense in Europe:Meeting the 21st Century Authoritarian Challenge, 2020, with Murielle Delaporte
Joint by Design: The Evolution of Australian Defence Strategy, 2020
Training for the High End Fight: The Strategic Shift of the 2020s, 2021
The USSR and the Western Alliance, re-issue 2021, with Susan Clark
2020: A Pivotal Year?: Navigating Strategic Change at a Time of COVID-19 Disruption, 2021
The U.S. Marine Corps Transformation Path: Preparing for the High-End Fight, 2022
Defense XXI: Shaping a Way Ahead for the United States and Its Allies, 2022

See also
Allies of World War II
Alexander Bovin
Robert C. Tucker
Rivista Italiana Difesa
World Federation of Democratic Youth

References

External links
breakingdefense.com
ifri.org
YouTube
Pakistan Today
indiastrategic.in
Fox News

1946 births
Living people
Columbia University alumni
Queens College, City University of New York faculty
Princeton University faculty
Johns Hopkins University faculty